Kim Ah Yeong (born 1972) is a Korean voice actor. She joined the Munhwa Broadcasting Corporation's voice acting division in 1997.

Roles

Broadcast TV
CSI: Miami (replacing Emily Procter, Korea TV Edition, MBC)
Smallville (TV series) (replacing Kristin Kreuk, Korea TV Edition, MBC)
Magic Fantasy Choiyooki (Korea TV Edition, AniOne)
Ojamajo Doremi (Korea TV Edition, MBC)
Sorcerer Hunters (Korea TV Edition, MBC)
Bumperking Zapper (SBS)
Bumerang Fighter (Bikkuriman, Korea TV Edition, MBC)
Shaman King (Korea TV Edition, AniOne)
Winx Club (SBS) - Tecna

Movie dubbing
X-Men (film) (replacing Anna Paquin, Korea TV Edition, MBC)

See also
Munhwa Broadcasting Corporation
MBC Voice Acting Division

External links
MBC Voice Acting Division Kim Ah Yeong Blog (in Korean)

Living people
South Korean voice actresses
1972 births